Essman is a surname. Notable people with the surname include:

 Rauni Essman (1918–1999), Finnish sprinter
 Susie Essman (born 1955), American stand-up comedian, actress, writer, and television producer